Histeria! is an American animated series created by Tom Ruegger and produced by Warner Bros. Animation.  Unlike other animated series produced by Warner Bros. in the 1990s, Histeria! was an explicitly educational program created to meet FCC requirements for educational/informational content for children.

Histeria! aired on Kids' WB from September 14, 1998 to March 31, 2000, and continued to air reruns until August 30, 2001. The show was presented as a Saturday Night Live-style sketch comedy, with its cast often filling the roles of historical figures. It was to be WB's most ambitious project since Animaniacs. Like the aforementioned series, 65 episodes were originally going to be made, but due to being $10 million over budget, only 52 episodes were completed before production of the series was canceled in March 2000. Due to the high production costs, footage from previous episode was often re-used and re-timed to match newly recorded audio, as well as several non-educational segments being used as filler. More recently, the show was aired on In2TV, first from March to July 2006, and then returning in October of that year. In January 2009, all of the episodes were taken off the site.

Summary 
Like other animated series produced at the time by the Warner Bros. animation studio, Histeria! derived most of humor from its slapstick comedy and satire, with the distinction of  combining historical figures and events.  Episodes would commonly feature a large cast of children and typecast adults in comedic skits and song parodies, e.g. the cause of the American Civil War sung to the tune of  The Brady Bunch theme.

Characters

The hosts 

 Father Time (Frank Welker) is the main "host" of Histeria!, allowing the cast to "travel" through time. He is dark-skinned, has a long beard and is shown to get quite irritated by the Kid Chorus when they fail to get their facts right. This tends to irritate Loud Kiddington who often screams "SHEESH, WHAT A GROUCH!" after he is out of sight.
 Big Fat Baby (Luke Ruegger) is the egg-shaped sidekick to Father Time, frequently accompanying him as he introduces the sketches. He is known for the foul odor he carries, caused by his constant defecation in his diaper, which is constantly stated to have been unchanged since ancient times. Big Fat Baby is also accident prone, often falling down steps or off of high places. There seems to be multiple Big Fat Babies, including some female versions with a single strand of hair and bow.
 Miss Information (Laraine Newman) is an aptly named ditzy tour guide who leads a group of tourists through various moments in history, as if the world is her own personal museum. As her name suggests, she is constantly getting her facts wrong and sometimes coming up with some demented logic to justify her statement (for example, she believes the Washington Monument is not named after George Washington because it is not called the George Monument).
 The World's Oldest Woman (Tress MacNeille) is a very old woman who claims to remember when air was invented. She also claims to have dated every historical male in history. She seems to have a particular romantic interest in Bill Straitman. She is known to romantically hound every male host of an episode as well.

The Kid Chorus 

 Loud Kiddington is a young boy so named for the extremely loud volume in which he talks. He often performs "dramatic reenactments" of loud moments in history, such as the Big Bang and the creation of dynamite; with each of this, the viewer is told to turn up the TV volume "for maximum effect." Sometimes, he also keeps watch of something by almost silently muttering "I see it, I see it..." when it is in sight and then switching to screaming "DON'T SEE IT! DON'T SEE IT!" when he loses sight of it. He is voiced by Tom Ruegger's son, Cody Ruegger, and the character's personality is based on Cody because he "has the tendency to be the loudest kid on Earth".
 Charity Bazaar (Laraine Newman] is the female lead of the Histeria! Kid Chorus, and her main personality trait is that she is usually depicted as being very depressed, as shown by her catch phrase, "I'm not happy." She tends to speak in a monotone unless excited or singing, something she appears to genuinely enjoy. She is willing to take a stand for animal rights, can be easily tempted with promises of being given cookies, and hates doing math homework.
 Froggo (Nathan Ruegger) is a short blonde-haired boy in the Kid Chorus with a low, frog-like voice, hence his name. He often asks historical figures for two seemingly useless items that he can actually make an invention out of, though he does not always receive the requested items. He is also shown to have a large appetite, but dislikes turnips, and in "Americana", it is shown that he is a big fan of Batman.
 Aka Pella (Cree Summer) is an African American member of the Kid Chorus who uses sassy lingo, often delivering comedically timed insults to whoever she is currently hanging out with. Unlike most of the other girls in the Kid Chorus, she is a tomboy and tends to be able to be a voice of reason to the group.
 Pepper Mills (Tress MacNeille) is a hyperactive teenage fangirl driven to adoration for any and all celebrities. Virtually everything she says is followed by enthusiastic scream. She constantly gets historical figures to give her autographs, and is then shocked to learn they are not the pop cultural celebrities for whom she has mistaken them. She also occasionally hosts an interview show titled Pepper's Pep Rally. She seems to be incredibly fast and will pop up and scream until the person she is pestering agrees to give an autograph.
 Toast (Tress MacNeille) is a clueless surfer teenager whose name comes from the idea that his brain is fried like toast. His name is also due to the fact that his skin is perpetually sunburnt. He hosts a talk show titled Ask Me If I Care, in which he invites historical celebrities to tell him what they are famous for, only for him to eventually eject them into the sky (sometimes even into space), because he never does care about what they are telling him. He also once mentions having a rock band, which he names Nasty Head Wound, and also mentions that he has an uncle named Melba.
 Cho-Cho (Tress MacNeille) is a little Chinese girl who is more devious than she looks. Always accompanied by Lucky Bob, she likes to follow people around, refusing to leave them alone until they buy what she is selling. Her dialogue is almost always accompanied by "Chopsticks" as the background music.
 Lucky Bob (Jeff Bennett) is a boy with a very noticeable overbite. He tends to speak with a dim-witted drawl. He usually only speaks when agreeing with something another character has said (regardless of whatever they said), using Ed McMahon catchphrases such as "You are correct, sir," "Yes now," and "Hi-yo!"
 Pule Houser (Frank Welker) is an overweight kid in the show's cast who tends to take abuse and is prone to pitching fits.
 Susanna Susquahanna (Tress MacNeille) is a little Native American girl with beady eyes and a large gap in her front teeth that gave her a gigantic, Sylvester-like lisp. She usually affirms things by saying "Thath's Twue" (That's true).
 Kip Ling, Chipper the Crooked Mouth Boy, and the Bow-Haired Girl are three additional Kid Chorus members who usually only show up in the songs or in crowd shots. They do not seem to have any distinguishing characteristics or dialogue like the rest of the group.

Others 
 Bill Straitman (James Wickline) is the straight man to the rest of the characters. He typically winds up interviewing both historical figures and the World's Oldest Woman, the latter of which he struggles to fight off her advances.
 Mr. Smartypants (Rob Paulsen) is a shy genius who wears exceedingly large pants and spouts various tidbits of knowledge. The only part of his upper body ever seen are the top of his head and his hands. In a piece of irony, he harbors romantic feelings for Miss Information. Mr. Smartypants often explains historical facts of crude nature, such as the invention of the toilet, which exasperates Lydia Karaoke as the network censor.
 Chit Chatterson (Billy West) is an eccentric commercial salesman, often attempting to swindle his customers.
 Fetch (Frank Welker) is Loud's aptly named talking dog, who loves chasing tennis balls and frequently asks the historical figures if they want to play catch with him. He always appears with Loud whenever the latter is attempting to sell something, with Loud claiming that he will make Fetch eat something unpleasant should he fail to make a sale, for which Fetch is never prepared. He appears to be of the same breed of dog as Hunter from Road Rovers.
 Lydia Karaoke (Nora Dunn) is an employee for Kids' WB who has been assigned as the network censor for the show, and given the show's nature, this can be quite a hassle for her. Often, she interrupts the sketches to complain that what is about to be or has just been shown is inappropriate for children's television (usually violence, foul language, nudity, and anything considered gross or rude). Infrequently, her attempts to moderate the show results in physical harm for her, resulting in her conceding to the original point. Lydia is also the host of "What's My Job?", a game show in which the contestants must guess the job of the historical figure featured, which, to her frustration, they can never come close to doing. According to the episode "Histeria Goes to the Moon", Karaoke used to work for the Weather Channel.
 Sammy Melman (Rob Paulsen) is a spoof of the smarmy and desperate television executives, constantly belittling and demeaning the Histeria! cast for the sake of ratings.
 Molly Pitcher (Tress Macneille) constantly offers refreshments in the form of water with a wide grin, saucer-sized eyes and overly cheery disposition, modelled after Martha Stewart.
 Nostradamus (Paul Rugg) claims to be able to "predictiate" the future, though he is proven wrong on occasion. He often acts erratically and impatiently, and will constantly yell "Shutup" in the middle of a sentence, usually to quiet any sort of audience.

Parody of historical figures 
Most of the recurring real-life historical figures in Histeria! were portrayed as caricatures of real-life celebrities from the modern era. The intent was to make analogies to contemporary individuals in terms of personalities and attitudes. Some of these include:

 Hervé Villechaize as Napoleon Bonaparte (Jeff Bennett)
 Bob Hope as George Washington (Maurice LaMarche)
 Bette Davis as Elizabeth I (Tress Macneille)
 Jack Benny as Thomas Jefferson (Billy West)
 Woody Allen as Sigmund Freud (Rob Paulsen) and Woodrow Wilson (Maurice LaMarche)
 Frank Sinatra as Julius Caesar (Fred Travalena)
 Regis Philbin as Alexander Graham Bell (Jeff Bennett)
 Jay Leno as Benjamin Franklin (Billy West)
 John Cleese as Isaac Newton (Jeff Bennett)
 Katharine Hepburn as Eleonor Roosevelt (Tress Macneille)
 Cary Grant as William Shakespeare (Maurice LaMarche)
 Arnold Schwarzenegger as Leif Erikson (Jeff Bennett)
 Ricardo Montalbán as Moctezuma I (Paul Rugg)
 Kirk Douglas as Amerigo Vespucci and Michelangelo (both voiced by Maurice LaMarche)
 George Burns as Thomas Edison and John Adams (both voiced by Billy West)
 Bing Crosby as Socrates (Maurice LaMarche)
 Pee-Wee Herman as William Tecumseh Sherman (Billy West)
 Dean Martin as Marc Antony and William Clark (both voiced by Fred Travalena)
 Jerry Lewis as Meriwether Lewis (Paul Rugg)
 Christopher Walken as Nicola Tesla (Jeff Bennett)
 Charo as Eva Peron (Charo)
 Tasmanian Devil (Looney Tunes) as Atilla the Hun (Jim Cummings)
 Fred Rogers as Plato (Jeff Bennett)
 Gregory Peck as Richard E. Byrd (Frank Welker)

Episodes

Series overview

Season 1 (1998–99)

Season 2 (1999–2000)

See also 

 Tiny Toon Adventures
 Animaniacs
 Freakazoid!
 Toonsylvania
 Once Upon a Time... Man
 Max, the 2000-Year-Old Mouse
 History Bites
 Time Squad
 Mr. Peabody & Sherman
 Horrible Histories

References

External links 

 
 Histeria profile - Warner Bros. Animation
 Histeria! Episodes which were directed by Mike Milo

1998 American television series debuts
2000 American television series endings
1990s American animated television series
2000s American animated television series
1990s American children's comedy television series
2000s American children's comedy television series
1990s American satirical television series
2000s American satirical television series
1990s American time travel television series
2000s American time travel television series
American children's animated comedy television series
American children's animated education television series
Animated television series about children
Animation based on real people
Cultural depictions of Nostradamus
English-language television shows
Fictional depictions of Abraham Lincoln in television
Historical television series
Kids' WB original shows
Television series by Warner Bros. Animation
Television series by Warner Bros. Television Studios
Television series created by Tom Ruegger